Xie Lihua (born 19 July 1965) is a Chinese long-distance runner. She competed in the women's 10,000 metres at the 1988 Summer Olympics.

References

1965 births
Living people
Place of birth missing (living people)
Chinese female long-distance runners
Olympic female long-distance runners
Olympic athletes of China
Athletes (track and field) at the 1988 Summer Olympics
Japan Championships in Athletics winners